School's Out! (also referred to on home video as Degrassi High: School's Out) is a 1992 Canadian made-for-television drama film written by Yan Moore and directed by Kit Hood, and the feature-length finale of the teen drama series Degrassi High (and predecessor Degrassi Junior High). Premiering on CBC Television on January 5, 1992, it was intended to be the end of the Degrassi franchise, until its revival in 2001 with Degrassi: The Next Generation.

The movie, centered on the Degrassi students during their first summer post-graduation, primarily focuses on the relationship between Joey Jeremiah (Pat Mastroianni) and Caitlin Ryan (Stacie Mistysyn); after Caitlin politely rejects Joey's marriage proposal, he begins becoming romantically involved with Tessa Campanelli (Kirsten Bourne), while also still being involved with Caitlin; he has sex with both, with Tessa being first, and brags about it with his friends. Later, Joey's friend Archie "Snake" Simpson (Stefan Brogren), frustrated of his inability to get a girlfriend, ultimately reveals this fact at a party while Caitlin is in the same room, causing her to break the relationship off. Joey and Snake's friend, Derek "Wheels" Wheeler (Neil Hope) starts drinking heavily, resulting in a car crash which kills a two year old boy and blinds the class valedictorian Lucy Fernandez (Anais Granofsky).

The movie was noted for its inclusion of coarse language and more sexually-oriented content as opposed to the television series, including two instances of the word "fuck" during the movie's climax, and a scene depicting how a condom is applied, despite the CBC's refusal to run condom commercials. The film marked the first time "fuck" was uttered on Canadian television. The film received a positive critical reception after its initial broadcast, although some reviews were mixed. In Canada, it drew in 2.3 million viewers, double that of what the preceding series usually received. In 1993, it was nominated for a Gemini Award for Best TV Movie.

Plot 
The movie begins as the class of 1992 graduates, and everyone begins to make plans for the summer and their future. Joey Jeremiah (Pat Mastroianni), who was held back a year in Degrassi Junior High, prepares for another year of high school; conversely, his longtime girlfriend Caitlin Ryan (Stacie Mistysyn) graduates with Joey's former peers after having taken extra classes and completing high school in three years instead of four. She, Lucy Fernandez (Anais Granofsky), and Joey's friend Snake (Stefan Brogren), who works as a lifeguard over the summer and seems to be unable to attract women, make plans for university. Wheels (Neil Hope), Joey and Snake's friend, gets into cars and begins drinking, buying a used car in need of repairs.

Eager to hold on to her before she leaves for university to study journalism, Joey proposes to Caitlin at a graduation party hosted by Lucy. Caitlin demurs, explaining that she is not ready for that kind of commitment. Joey storms out, only to run into classmate Tessa Campanelli (Kirsten Bourne) fresh from an argument with her boyfriend Todd (Christian Campbell), and agrees to give her a ride home. Arriving at the Campanelli house, Tessa pulls Joey toward her for a kiss. The next day, on a break from the photo shop where she works with Spike (Amanda Stepto), Tessa visits Joey next door at the drug store where he works and asks him on a date. Joey, though initially hesitant, accepts Tessa's offer, and later tells Wheels he went to "third base". Tessa confides in Spike the details of the relationship. Spike reminds her that Joey and Caitlin have a pattern of breaking up and reuniting, but Tessa notes that Caitlin will be leaving for university in a matter of weeks. With Caitlin working most evenings and weekends as a waitress and Joey working days, they spend little time together, and Joey starts seeing Tessa more frequently, culminating in them having sex. He continues to date Tessa while he dates Caitlin, with neither realizing he is dating both.

By the middle of August, Tessa discovers she is pregnant. When she realizes that Joey is still with Caitlin with no intention of breaking up with her, she dumps him on his nineteenth birthday. She is last seen entering a women's health clinic. That night, Joey and Caitlin have sex, with it being Caitlin's first time. The next day, at an end of the summer lake house party, hosted by Lucy's boyfriend Bronco (L. Dean Ifill), Caitlin accepts Joey's earlier marriage proposal. Snake lashes out at both Joey and Wheels for their constant teasing about his apparent inability to get a girlfriend, with Snake physically fighting Wheels, and announcing Joey's infidelity. Caitlin overhears this and confronts Joey about it, telling him that she was going to study locally in order to be with him. She breaks off the engagement and locks herself in a room, with Joey repeatedly banging the door pleading that he could explain. Immediately after unintentionally breaking up Joey and Caitlin, Snake realises that former classmate Allison Hunter (Sara Holmes) is drowning and rushes into the lake to rescue her.  Everyone congratulates him for saving her life, but he breaks down in a flood of emotion and anxiety.

Wheels, who had been drinking heavily, is taken out by Lucy so they can get more chips, but ends up crashing into another car. The crash kills a two-year-old boy in the other car, and seriously injures Lucy and the driver of the other car. The next day, Joey visits Wheels in jail, where Wheels tells him he has been charged with one count of criminal negligence causing death, two counts of criminal negligence causing injury, and drunk driving. He asserts that it was not his fault that the child was not wearing a seatbelt or that Lucy wanted to get more chips. Caitlin visits Lucy at the hospital where she is immobilized and unsure if she will ever see or walk again. Later, Joey stops to see Snake as he prepares to leave for university and asks why he will not accept Wheels' phone calls. Snake is disgusted by Wheels, particularly in light of Wheels having lost his own parents to a drunk driver. He apologizes to Joey for saying what he said at Bronco's place. Joey accepts his apology, saying that Caitlin would have found out sooner or later.

Two months later, most of the gang get together for the wedding of Alexa Pappadopoulos (Irene Courakos) and Simon Dexter (Michael Carry). Absent are Wheels, Erica (Angela Deiseach), and Lucy. Wheels, still incarcerated, is planning to plead guilty for his crimes. Erica is teaching abroad in the Dominican Republic and has met a new boyfriend in the process. Spike is going to university while Emma is in junior kindergarten. Meanwhile, Lucy has since regained vision in one of her eyes, but is still not well enough to attend the wedding. Snake is accompanied by his girlfriend Pam (Tara Burt) whom he met at university and is implied to have finally lost his virginity to her, and he appears considerably more self-assured; he still has yet to get into contact with Wheels. Joey and Snake have an awkward reunion, but make plans to hang out before he goes back to university. Joey also apologizes for hurting Caitlin, who forgives him, and as Simon and Alexa have their first dance as husband and wife, former fiancés Joey and Caitlin share a dance as friends.

Cast

Production and writing 

During development of School's Out, six of Degrassi's actors filmed Degrassi Talks, a six-part non-fiction miniseries in which the actors interviewed teenagers and young adults across Canada about issues explored in the show. Principal photography for School's Out began on July 21, 1991. In the movie's climax, Snake, having been teased by Joey and Wheels for his seeming inability to get a girlfriend, announces Joey's infidelity by saying: "Joey spends his summer dating Caitlin...and fucking Tessa!", as Caitlin overhears, to which she questions Joey: "You were fucking Tessa Campanelli?". Yan Moore explained the use of the word "fuck" in the film: "There was a tension growing, especially between Joey and Snake. Snake had this tremendous frustration and the word had never been used in a script before. So, when Snake finally lost it with Joey, the word was included. Since Caitlin overheard the conversation, it just seemed right for her to use that totally un-Caitlin-like word."

In a radio interview with Nardwuar in March 1992, Amanda Stepto, who played Spike, was asked about how they were able to avoid scrutiny from the network over using the word "fuck", to which she responded that the CBC allowed them to use the word because of the context of the scene and the nature of the situation, in which it would have made little sense to use lighter language  Stepto later commented that the CBC supported a big finale for the series and allowed the writers to incorporate more risqué content. The usage of the word "fuck" marked the first time it had been said on Canadian prime-time television.

The outcome of Tessa Campanelli's pregnancy was purposefully left ambiguous. Pat Mastroianni explained in 2017 that while Tessa was seen walking into an abortion clinic for an appointment, "you never actually see, as an audience, if she went through with it".

Music
The film featured eight songs from the debut album of Toronto-based rock group Harem Scarem. After the movie aired, Toronto radio station Q-107 received multiple requests to play Harem Scarem's music. It also featured songs from several popular Canadian artists including Gowan (the songs "Moonlight Desires" and "All the Lovers in the World"), The Box, Spoons, Amy Sky, Images in Vogue and Malcolm Burn.

Release

Broadcast 
School's Out aired on CBC Television at 8:00.p.m on January 5, 1992. The film drew 2.3 million viewers on the network, doubling the average audience that Degrassi High received. In Australia, the film premiered on ABC TV at 8:30.p.m on May 17, 1993, preceded by an introduction from Afternoon Show host Michael Tunn. The film did not premiere in the United States until over two years later, when it aired on PBS, the network that aired the television series, on June 20, 1994.

Home media
School's Out was released on VHS by ABC Video and Roadshow Entertainment in Australia in 1993, and WGBH Boston Home Video in the United States on March 7, 2000. It was later released as part of the Degrassi High: The Complete Collection DVD box set by WGBH on October 9, 2007, and on the Degrassi High Collection set by Force Entertainment in Australia on March 12, 2008.

Critical reception 
School's Out received critical praise from the Canadian press on its original broadcast. Writing for the Vancouver Sun, Hester Riches felt that like the movie successfully "took risks" in the same vein as the preceding series. She called the choice to center the movie on Joey and Caitlin, whose actors she felt were the strongest, a wise decision. Writing for The Canadian Press, Bill Anderson stated that although the love triangle made up a significant part of the film's story, the inclusion of "deft subplotting" resulted in a "memorable" end to the film's story, and that the movie put "a brilliant cap" on the "honest, compelling" tradition that the Degrassi shows had created. Riches, along with columnist Janice Kennedy, both noted the inclusion of a scene of Lucy Fernandez showing Caitlin Ryan how to apply a condom to a man's genitals, despite CBC's refusal to run advertisements about condoms.

Writing for the Sydney Morning Herald, Alison Stewart praised the film and called it "much more real television" than its American counterpart Beverly Hills, 90210.  Australian film critic Adrian Martin, who noted that he was an avid fan of the TV series, gave the film a mixed to negative review, feeling that the movie was "a little disappointing" and a departure from the "daggy everydayness" typical of the shows. In addition, Martin pointed out a "punishing sense of morality" exemplified by the catastrophic events experienced by several of its characters. The movie was nominated for a Gemini Award for Best TV Movie in 1993, the same year that Degrassi Talks was nominated for Best Youth Program Or Series.

Legacy 
According to the Toronto Star, School's Out marked the first time that the word "fuck" had been used on Canadian television.

Amanda Stepto, who played Spike, dislikes the film. In a late 1990s online interview, she called it "too adult" and "not a very good send off", and criticized the lack of representation and closure of several characters' plotlines, including her own. In an interview on Mike Park's I'm In Love With A Girl Named Spike podcast in January 2019, when asked about the film, Stepto explained how she had "fucking begged" to be in the film's party scenes because she was living on her own and unable to pay her rent at the time of filming, but was ultimately not given a bigger role.

In the wake of the movie's 25th anniversary in 2017, Fashion magazine Lesa Hannah called it "a truly iconic piece of Canadiana".

References

Sources

External links
 School's Out at official Degrassi website
 School's Out at Degrassi.ca
 

Degrassi (franchise)
1992 television films
1992 films
1992 drama films
1990s Canadian films
1990s coming-of-age drama films
1990s English-language films
1990s teen drama films
Canadian coming-of-age drama films
Canadian drama television films
Canadian teen drama films
CBC Television original films
DHX Media films
English-language Canadian films
Films set in Toronto
Television films based on television series
Works about driving under the influence